Dennis J. Hejlik, is a retired USMC Lieutenant General. Hejlik previously served as commanding general of United States Marine Corps Forces, Europe and United States Marine Corps Forces Command. Until early 2008, Hejlik commanded the newly established Marine Special Operations Command.

Military career
Hejlik, a native of Garner, Iowa, enlisted in 1968, rising to the rank of sergeant before accepting honorable discharge in 1972 to pursue education. He graduated from Minnesota State University, Mankato in 1975, returning to the Marines as a mustang second lieutenant through the Platoon Leaders Class Program.

As a commissioned officer, Hejlik has had commands at the platoon, company, and battalion, brigade, and corps levels. He has also served as a tactics instructor at the Amphibious Warfare School. Hejlik graduated from the Naval War College at Newport, Rhode Island in 1993.  As a lieutenant colonel, Hejlik assumed command of 1st Battalion, 2nd Marines. The Marine Barracks in Washington, DC came under his command in 1997. While there, Hejlik barred the Marines under his command from a number of gay bars in the city in an attempt to curb antagonism between Marines and the gay community. In 1999, he was appointed as Military Secretary to the Commandant of the Marine Corps.

He was assigned as the Principal Director for Special Operations and Combating Terrorism in 2001, then as chief of staff and director of the Center for Command Support in 2002. He was next assigned as deputy commanding general of I Marine Expeditionary Force, which holds a secondary billet as commander of the 1st Marine Expeditionary Brigade, both headquartered at Camp Pendleton, in July 2004 until late 2005. With that unit, Hejlik was involved in preparing the counter-insurgency efforts during the United States occupation of Fallujah.

Hejlik was named the first commander of the Marine Special Operations Command. The command was first announced on November 1, 2005, becoming the first Special Operations Command unit of the Marine Corps. Hejlik was a vocal supporter of the new command, which opponents claim detracts from the Corps' status and reputation as an all-elite force. Proponents, including Defense Secretary Donald Rumsfeld, claim special operations units, to include Marines, are essential in the War on Terrorism.

Hejlik was confirmed by the Senate for promotion to the rank of major general on March 16, 2006. He was then nominated for promotion to the rank of lieutenant general on March 13, 2008, to become the Commander of the II Marine Expeditionary Force; and confirmed for promotion by the Senate on April 29, 2008. In April 2010, he was nominated by President Obama to relieve Richard F. Natonski as commander of Marine Forces Command.

Hejlik served as Commanding General, II Marine Expeditionary Force, Camp Lejeune, North Carolina, from July 2008 until August 2010.

Awards and decorations
Medals awarded to Hejlik include: 
 

General Hejlik is also the winner of the Leftwich Trophy.

See also

References

External links
Official Marine biography
II MEF biography
Dennis Hejlik's retirement

Year of birth missing (living people)
Living people
United States Marine Corps personnel of the Gulf War
United States Marine Corps personnel of the Iraq War
Recipients of the Legion of Merit
United States Marine Corps generals
United States Marine Corps officers
People from Garner, Iowa
Minnesota State University, Mankato alumni
Recipients of the Defense Superior Service Medal
Recipients of the Leftwich Trophy
Recipients of the Humanitarian Service Medal